Lazarus "Lazzy" Mokgosi is a South African politician who has been a Member of the North West Provincial Legislature since December 2022. He is a member of the African National Congress (ANC) and in August 2022 was elected to a four-year term as Deputy Provincial Chairperson of the party's North West branch.

According to City Press, Mokgosi was elected to the party office on a slate of candidates aligned to Nono Maloyi, who was elected ANC Provincial Chairperson at the same party elective conference. Mokgosi won the position in a contest against Paul Sebegoe; he received 353 votes against Sebego's 311. He was sworn into the provincial legislature in December, reportedly after the ANC amended its party list to elevate him. He filled a casual vacancy arising from the resignation of Wendy Matsemela earlier that month.

References 

Living people
African National Congress politicians
Members of the North West Provincial Legislature
21st-century South African politicians
Year of birth missing (living people)